is a Japanese naval officer who served as the Self Defense Fleet's Commander of the Japanese Maritime Self Defence Force (JMSDF) from 2014 to 2015. He is the 47th Commander of the Self-Defense Fleet, succeeding Yasushi Matsushita. In 2015, he was succeeded by Yasuhiro Shigeoka.

Career 
Born in Tokyo. In 1980 March, he graduated from the Faculty of Law, University of Tokyo and in April, he joined the Maritime Self-Defense Force as a 31st general executive candidate (equivalent to the 24th term of the National Defense Academy).

In July 1996, he was promoted to 2nd class Kaisa.

In January 1999, he was promoted to 1st class Kaisa.

In June 2000, Defense Division, Defense Department, Maritime Staff Office.

In January 2001, Chief of the Defense Division, Defense Department, Maritime Staff Office.

In August 2002, Commander of the 1st Fleet Air Corps, 1st Fleet Air Group.

In July 2003, Joint Staff Office, 5th Staff Office, Defense Planning Coordinator and General Team Leader.

On 28 July 2005, he was promoted to Rear Admiral, Commander of the 22nd Fleet Air Group.

On 28 March 2007, Chief of Staff, Maizuru District General Manager.

On 1 December 2008, Inspector General of the Maritime Staff Office.

On 21 July 2009, General Manager of Personnel Education Department, Maritime Staff Office.

On 5 August 2011, he was promoted to Seaman, Commander of Air Training Command.

On 26 July 2012, Deputy Chief of the Maritime Staff Office.

On 28 March 2014, 47th Commander of the Self-Defense Fleet.

On 4 August 2015, he was retired from the Navy.

Awards 
 
 2nd Defensive Memorial Cordon

 3rd Defensive Memorial Cordon

 9th Defensive Memorial Cordon

 11th Defensive Memorial Cordon

 16th Defensive Memorial Cordon

 18th Defensive Memorial Cordon

 19th Defensive Memorial Cordon

 20th Defensive Memorial Cordon

 21st Defensive Memorial Cordon

 26th Defensive Memorial Cordon

 27th Defensive Memorial Cordon

 32nd Defensive Memorial Cordon

 33rd Defensive Memorial Cordon

 36th Defensive Memorial Cordon

 41st Defensive Memorial Cordon

See also 
 Japanese military ranks

References 

1955 births
People from Tokyo
Living people
University of Tokyo alumni